Souvenir are an indie pop/electropop band formed in 1999 in Pamplona, Spain, who have released six studio albums.

History
Souvenir perform their songs in French, sung by Patricia de la Fuente, and mainly written by multi-instrumentalist J'aime Cristóbal.  They debuted with a 6-track self-titled EP in 2000, which was reissued in America by Shelflife Records, displaying Europop and bossanova influences. Their popularity spread to the Asian independent market, and in 2001, their first full-length album, Points de Suspension was released. Special editions of the record were released in Japan (on Tone Vendor records) and the United States (on Shelflife).
 
Their second album, Recto/Verso, was released in 2003, and the band were featured on several international compilations including a tribute album to Serge Gainsbourg.
 
Cristóbal was commissioned by French chanteuse Françoiz Breut to write songs for her Une Saison Volée album, which included his song Ciudad del Mar. Souvenir's third album was released in 2005 - Des équilibres featured pop songs with pianos, mellow guitars and lap steel guitars.  In 2006, they collaborated on the Brian Wilson tribute album Caroline Now!, which also featured Belle And Sebastian, Teenage Fanclub, Saint Etienne, The High Llamas, and The Pastels. The album Des équilibres 82006) followed, with songs in the vein of the Nouvelle Chanson genre.

For their fourth studio album, 64, issued in 2007, the band took a radical turn in their sound into electropop. The record was followed by an album of remixes by Johan Agebjörn and other artists. In a Stylus Magazine review, Dom Passantino opined "Souvenir give us an austerity, poise, and hautiness of tone that would convince anyone they were born the wrong side of the Pyrenees". In 2009, Souvenir released their fifth album, Drums, Sex and Dance, which includes their first song in English (The Sun Goes Out).

On February 21, 2011, the new Souvenir album Travelogues was released.

Discography

Albums
Points de Suspension (2001) Jabalina/Shelflife
Recto/verso (2003) Jabalina
Des Equilibres (2005) Jabalina
64 (2007) Jabalina
Drums, Sex and Dance (2009) Jabalina
Travelogues (2011) Jabalina

Singles, EPs
Souvenir EP (2000) Jabalina/Shelflife
Premier essai (2001) Jabalina
Présage de l’hiver (2005) Jabalina
Extras 64 (2007) Jabalina
Aime-moi (vinyl) (2010) Jabalina

References

External links
Official Website of the Band Souvenir
Souvenir at Last.fm
Points de Suspension review, Dave Heaton, erasing clouds

Spanish indie rock groups
Musical groups established in 1999
1999 establishments in Spain